"Promise Me" is a song written by  Amanda Espinet and Victor Franco and is the first single from the album Life Goes On, released by freestyle singer Lil Suzy on October 10, 1994. It is Lil Suzy's most successful song on the Billboard Hot 100 chart, peaking at No. 62.

This song was launched by Empress Music label, which belonged to Lil Suzy and who at the time she was 16 years old.

Track listing
 US CD/12" single

Charts

References

Lil Suzy songs
1994 singles
1994 songs